Ilias Kampas (born 13 February 1974) is a Greek former professional footballer.

References

1974 births
Living people
Paniliakos F.C. players
Asteras Tripolis F.C. players
Ilisiakos F.C. players
Atromitos F.C. players
Ilioupoli F.C. players
A.O. Glyfada players
Fostiras F.C. players
Super League Greece players
Association football forwards
Footballers from Athens
Greek footballers